National Secondary Route 143, or just Route 143 (or ) is a National Road Route of Costa Rica, located in the Alajuela, Guanacaste provinces.

Description
In Alajuela province the route covers Guatuso canton (San Rafael, Cote districts).

In Guanacaste province the route covers Tilarán canton (Arenal district).

References

Highways in Costa Rica